Hồ Quỳnh Hương (born 16 October 1980, in Hạ Long, Quảng Ninh) is a Vietnamese female singer. She has appeared in Asia Song Festival 2008, Bước nhảy hoàn vũ (season 1), Vietnam Idol (season 3) as a guest judge, Cặp đôi hoàn hảo (season 1), and The Voice of Vietnam (season 1) as an adviser. Hương was recently crowned as Asia's Sexiest Vegetarian Woman of 2013 by PETA Asia Pacific.

Ho Quynh Huong is considered one of the top female singer Vietnam and currently one of the judges of The X Factor Vietnam. In season 2 of The X Factor Vietnam her act Minh Như was the winner.

Discography

Studio albums
 Vào Đời (2003)
 Ngày Dịu Dàng (2004)
 Sao Tình Yêu (2005)
 14M - 2222 (2005)
 Non-Stop (2007)
 Diamond Noir (2007)
 Năng lượng (2009)
 Anh (2010)
 Giáng Sinh An Lành (2010)
 Quảng Ngãi Nhớ Thương (2012)
 Tĩnh lặng (2013)

Songs
 Wild Dances - exclusive rights for Vietnam for the winning 2004 Eurovision song from the Ukraine, performed in Vietnamese as Vũ điệu hoang dã.

References

External links
 website

21st-century Vietnamese women singers
1980 births
Living people
People from Quảng Ninh province